Cyril Kieft (1911–2004) was a Welsh industrialist and racing driver. He founded Kieft Cars, which produced Formula 3 cars and sports cars in the 1950s.

References
WalesOnline: Europe-wide search is on for rare Kieft car

External links
Cyril Kieft profile at The 500 Owners Association

1911 births
2004 deaths
Sportspeople from Swansea
20th-century Welsh businesspeople
Welsh racing drivers